Dóra Ivanics (born 29 June 1994 in Balassagyarmat) is a Hungarian handballer who plays for Vasas SC.

Achievements
Nemzeti Bajnokság I/B:
Winner: 2018

References

External links
 Career statistics at Worldhandball
 BUDAÖRS KC (2014/2015)

1994 births
Living people
People from Balassagyarmat
Hungarian female handball players
Sportspeople from Nógrád County